Guizar-Vasquez-Sanchez-Manzano syndrome is an extremely rare genetic and congenital disorder that is characterized by facial dysmorphisms (more specifically, chubby cheeks, mild frontal bossing, a beaked nose with an accompanying low nasal bridge, malar hypoplasia, peculiar philtrums and upper lips), pectus carinatum, and joint hypermobility. Only 2 cases have ever been reported in medical literature, with both of those cases coming from siblings of the same family.

References

Genetic diseases and disorders
Rare diseases
Rare syndromes
Congenital disorders